Minerva Urecal (born Florence Minerva Dunnuck; September 22, 1894 – February 26, 1966) was an American stage and radio performer as well as a character actress in Hollywood films and on various television series from the early 1950s to 1965.

Early years
Urecal was born in Eureka, California in 1894. She later formed her stage name by combining letters from the names of her hometown and state.

Career
Urecal was originally a vaudeville performer before venturing into radio and stage, later making her film debut in 1933. She played largely uncredited roles such as secretaries, laundresses and frontierswomen. She began working in television in the 1950s, favoring Westerns.

From 1932 to 1937, Urecal portrayed Mrs. Pasquale on the Sunday Night Hi-Jinks radio program.

On television Urecal played Maw Bowie, mother of the title character, in The Adventures of Jim Bowie (1956-1958). She guest-starred on CBS's My Friend Flicka, The Roy Rogers Show, The Lone Ranger, and the syndicated The Range Rider. She also had a recurring role in the 1953-1954 situation comedy Meet Mr. McNutley in the role of Josephine Bradley, the dean of a women's college. The program was broadcast on CBS radio and CBS-TV. She also played Billie the Barber in the 1950 episode of The Lone Ranger as "Billie the Great".

In 1957, Urecal had her only starring television role on the syndicated The Adventures of Tugboat Annie, playing the title character originally performed by Marie Dressler in the film Tugboat Annie in 1933 and continued by Marjorie Rambeau and Jane Darwell in two movie sequels. Later, in 1957, Urecal appeared as a landlady in the Perry Mason episode "The Case of the Fan Dancer's Horse". She then succeeded actress Hope Emerson, as nightclub owner "Mother", on the private detective series Peter Gunn.

Urecal appeared on the Walter Brennan ABC sitcom The Real McCoys in the series' 1960 episode "The Gigolo" and in the Western series Whispering Smith in the episode "Swift Justice". She was cast as a maid in the 1961 episode "Call Me Mother" of the CBS sitcom Angel, starring Annie Fargé. In 1965 she made her second appearance on Perry Mason, this time as Martha Glenhorn in "The Case of the Lover's Gamble", as well as appearing as Martha Winslow in the rural sitcom Petticoat Junction in an episode entitled 'A Tale of Two Dogs'. Her final television appearance was the following year, when she played Mrs. Griffin on an episode entitled 'Billie Jo's Independence Day' of Petticoat Junction.

Personal life and death
Urecal was married to Max Holtzer.

Urecal died in 1966 from a heart attack in Glendale, California, aged 71. She was buried in Hollywood Forever Cemetery

Selected filmography

 Her Bodyguard (1933) - Lingerie Clerk (uncredited)
 Bombshell (1933) - Autograph Seeker (uncredited)
 Meet the Baron (1933) - Downstairs Maid (uncredited)
 Sadie McKee (1934) - Brennan's Cook's Assistant (uncredited)
 Straight Is the Way (1934) - Woman Assisting the Clapmans (uncredited)
 Student Tour (1934) - Wife (uncredited)
 Biography of a Bachelor Girl (1935) - Ms. Bella 'Bell' Clark (uncredited)
 It Happened in New York (1935) - Spinster (uncredited)
 Man on the Flying Trapeze (1935) - Italian Woman in Ambulance (uncredited)
 Bonnie Scotland (1935) - Storekeeper (uncredited)
 Here Comes the Band (1935) - Italian Wife (uncredited)
 His Night Out (1935) - Wife (uncredited)
 Love on a Bet (1936) - Miss Jones - MacCreigh's Secretary (uncredited)
 Three Godfathers (1936) - Parishioner (uncredited)
 Fury (1936) - Fanny (uncredited)
 Bulldog Edition (1936) - Mrs. George Poppupoppalas (uncredited)
 God's Country and the Woman (1937) - Maisie (uncredited)
 Her Husband's Secretary (1937) - Miss Baldwin
 Oh, Doctor (1937) - Death Watch Mary Mackleforth
 Mountain Justice (1937) - Ella Crippen (uncredited)
 Charlie Chan at the Olympics (1937) - Gang Member Posing as Olympics Matron (uncredited)
 The Go Getter (1937) - Cappy Ricks' Secretary
 Ever Since Eve (1937) - Bellden's Receptionist (uncredited)
 Love in a Bungalow (1937) - Mrs. Kester
 Behind the Mike (1937) - Mrs. Reilly
 Life Begins with Love (1937) - Mrs. Murphy
 She Loved a Fireman (1937) - Nurse Purdy (uncredited)
 Exiled to Shanghai (1937) - Claire
 Paradise for Three (1938) - Hotel Guest Reading in Bed (uncredited)
 Prison Nurse (1938) - Sutherland
 Start Cheering (1938) - Miss Grimley
 The Lady in the Morgue (1938) - Mrs. Horn (uncredited)
 Air Devils (1938) - Margaret Price
 The Devil's Party (1938) - Maria - Jerry's Housekeeper (uncredited)
 Wives Under Suspicion (1938) - Lady in Courtroom (uncredited)
 City Streets (1938) - Mrs. Grimley (uncredited)
 Frontier Scout (1938) - Helen
 Dramatic School (1938) - Rose - Boulin's Secretary (uncredited)
 Thanks for Everything (1938) - Hatchet-Faced Woman (uncredited)
 Four Girls in White (1939) - Miss Perch - a Nurse (uncredited)
 You Can't Cheat an Honest Man (1939) - Screaming Spinster at Circus (uncredited)
 Let Us Live (1939) - Charwoman at Theatre Hold-Up (uncredited)
 S.O.S. Tidal Wave (1939) - (uncredited)
 Unexpected Father (1939) - Neighbor (uncredited)
 Second Fiddle (1939) - Miss Bland, the School Principal (uncredited)
 Should Husbands Work? (1939) - Noisy Neighbor (uncredited)
 Golden Boy (1939) - Grocery Customer (uncredited)
 No Place to Go (1939) - Miss Rice (uncredited)
 Dancing Co-Ed (1939) - Woman on Radio (voice, uncredited)
 Sabotage (1939) - Minor Role (uncredited)
 Little Accident (1939) - Woman (uncredited)
 Missing Evidence (1939) - Amy, Housewife (uncredited)
 Destry Rides Again (1939) - Mrs. DeWitt (uncredited)
 The Sagebrush Family Trails West (1940) - Widow Gail
 You Can't Fool Your Wife (1940) - Mrs. Doolittle
 Boys of the City (1940) - Agnes
 Wildcat Bus (1940) - Old Maid (uncredited)
 The Ape (1940) - Townswoman (uncredited)
 No, No, Nanette (1940) - Woman in Airport (uncredited)
 The San Francisco Docks (1940) - Landlady (uncredited)
 Six Lessons from Madame La Zonga (1941) - Irate Woman (uncredited)
 The Wild Man of Borneo (1941) - Mother of Baby (scenes deleted)
 Arkansas Judge (1941) - Miranda Wolfson
 Golden Hoofs (1941) - Myrt (uncredited)
 The Trial of Mary Dugan (1941) - Landlady (uncredited)
 Murder Among Friends (1941) - Mrs. O'Heaney (uncredited)
 A Man Betrayed (1941) - Librarian (uncredited)
 The Cowboy and the Blonde (1941) - Murphy
 Murder by Invitation (1941) - Maxine Denham
 Accent on Love (1941) - Teresa Lombroso
 Bowery Blitzkrieg (1941) - 'Picklepuss' - Reform School Matron (uncredited)
 Dressed to Kill (1941) - Landlady (uncredited)
 Man at Large (1941) - Mrs. Jones, Nervous Man's Wife
 Sailors on Leave (1941) - Crusty Woman (uncredited)
 Never Give a Sucker an Even Break (1941) - The Cleaning Woman
 Moon Over Her Shoulder (1941) - Mrs. Duggins - Scoutmistress (uncredited)
 They Died with Their Boots On (1941) - Nurse (uncredited)
 Skylark (1941) - Woman in Subway Car (uncredited)
 Marry the Boss's Daughter (1941) - Elevator Passenger (uncredited)
 Lady for a Night (1942) - Spinster in Audience (uncredited)
 A Tragedy at Midnight (1942) - Mattie - Housekeeper (uncredited)
 My Favorite Blonde (1942) - Stone-Faced Woman (uncredited)
 The Corpse Vanishes (1942) - Fagah
 In Old California (1942) - Mrs. Carson (uncredited)
 Henry and Dizzy (1942) - Mrs. Kilmer (uncredited)
 Beyond the Blue Horizon (1942) - Wife at Circus (uncredited)
 Sons of the Pioneers (1942) - Ellie Bixby
 Sweater Girl (1942) - Melinda
 The Man in the Trunk (1942) - Peggy's Landlady (uncredited)
 Henry Aldrich, Editor (1942) - Miss Schwellenhorn (uncredited)
 Daring Young Man (1942) - Nurse (uncredited)
 Riding Through Nevada (1942) - Widow Humbolt
 That Other Woman (1942) - Mrs. MacReady
 The Living Ghost (1942) - Delia Phillips
 Quiet Please, Murder (1942) - Cookbook-Seeking Library Patron (uncredited)
 Shadow of a Doubt (1943) - Mrs. Henderson (uncredited)
 The Powers Girl (1943) - Maggie (uncredited)
 Kid Dynamite (1943) - Judge
 Something to Shout About (1943) - Mrs. Starretton (uncredited)
 The Ape Man (1943) - Agatha Brewster
 Dixie Dugan (1943) - Mrs. Wilson (uncredited)
 Keep 'Em Slugging (1943) - Miss Billings (uncredited)
 White Savage (1943) - Native Woman (uncredited)
 A Stranger in Town (1943) - Lady Stepping Off Train (uncredited)
 Hit the Ice (1943) - Wife at Hospital (uncredited)
 Ghosts on the Loose (1943) - Hilda
 Wagon Tracks West (1943) - Landlady (uncredited)
 So This Is Washington (1943) - Mrs. Pomeroy (uncredited)
 Dangerous Blondes (1943) - Mrs. Swanson, Housekeeper (uncredited)
 My Kingdom for a Cook (1943) - Woman in Employment Office (uncredited)
 Klondike Kate (1943) - Sarah (uncredited)
 The Song of Bernadette (1943) - Woman Describing Baby's Recovery (uncredited)
 The Bridge of San Luis Rey (1944) - Uncle Pio's Servant (uncredited)
 Mr. Skeffington (1944) - Woman in Beauty Shop / Nightclub Patron (uncredited)
 Man from Frisco (1944) - Widow Allison (uncredited)
 Louisiana Hayride (1944) - Ma Crocker
 Block Busters (1944) - Amelia Rogiet
 When Strangers Marry (1944) - Landlady (uncredited)
 Kismet (1944) - Retainer (uncredited)
 The Doughgirls (1944) - Hatchet-Faced Woman (uncredited)
 Moonlight and Cactus (1944) - Abigail
 Music in Manhattan (1944) - Mrs. Smith, the Landlady (uncredited)
 The Mark of the Whistler (1944) - Woman Sweeping Front Stoop (uncredited)
 Irish Eyes Are Smiling (1944) - Militant Wife (uncredited)
 One Mysterious Night (1944) - Miss Wilkinson (uncredited)
 And Now Tomorrow (1944) - Patient (uncredited)
 Crazy Knights (1944) - Mrs. Benson
 The Kid Sister (1945) - Mrs. Wiggins
 Salty O'Rourke (1945) - Saleslady (uncredited)
 A Medal for Benny (1945) - Mrs. Chavez (uncredited)
 Wanderer of the Wasteland (1945) - Mama Rafferty
 A Bell for Adano (1945) - Italian Woman (uncredited)
 Mr. Muggs Rides Again (1945) - Nora 'Ma' Brown
 State Fair (1945) - Woman Congratulating Mrs. Metcalf (uncredited)
 Men in Her Diary (1945) - Mrs. Braun
 George White's Scandals (1945) - Teacher (scenes deleted)
 Sensation Hunters (1945) - Edna Rogers
 Voice of the Whistler (1945) - Georgie's Wife (uncredited)
 The Bells of St. Mary's (1945) - Landlady (uncredited)
 Who's Guilty? (1945) - Mrs. Dill
 Breakfast in Hollywood (1946) - Miss Mullins (uncredited)
 Partners in Time (1946) - Miss Abernathy (uncredited)
 The Virginian (1946) - Christopher's Mother (uncredited)
 The Dark Corner (1946) - Client Wife (uncredited)
 The Bride Wore Boots (1946) - Minor Role (uncredited)
 Rainbow Over Texas (1946) - Mama Lolita
 The Well-Groomed Bride (1946) - Woman (uncredited)
 Without Reservations (1946) - Sue (uncredited)
 Little Miss Big (1946) - Woman (uncredited)
 No Leave, No Love (1946) - Mrs. Hanlon's Friend (uncredited)
 Crime Doctor's Man Hunt (1946) - Second Landlady (uncredited)
 Sioux City Sue (1946) - Mrs. Abercrombie - Elite Hotel Manager (uncredited)
 The Trap (1946) - Miss Weebles, the Housekeeper
 Wake Up and Dream (1946) - Mrs. Edna Lucash (uncredited)
 Ladies' Man (1947) - Mrs. Ryan (uncredited)
 California (1947) - Emma (uncredited)
 Apache Rose (1947) - Felicia
 The Devil Thumbs a Ride (1947) - Mrs. Barnaby (uncredited)
 Undercover Maisie (1947) - Delicatessen Woman (uncredited)
 Blaze of Noon (1947) - Woman in Church (uncredited)
 Saddle Pals (1947) - Cora Downey (uncredited)
 High Conquest (1947) - Miss Woodley - replaced by Mary Field (scenes deleted)
 Heartaches (1947) - Charwoman (uncredited)
 The Secret Life of Walter Mitty (1947) - Woman with Hat (uncredited)
 Cynthia (1947) - Agnes, Jannings' Cook (uncredited)
 Bowery Buckaroos (1947) - U.S. Marshal Kate T. Barlow
 The Lost Moment (1947) - Maria
 Sitting Pretty (1948) - Mrs. Maypole (uncredited)
 April Showers (1948) - Landlady (uncredited)
 The Noose Hangs High (1948) - Husky Woman (uncredited)
 Fury at Furnace Creek (1948) - Mrs. Crum (uncredited)
 Secret Service Investigator (1948) - Mrs. McGiven- Landlady
 Marshal of Amarillo (1948) - Mrs. Henry Pettigrew
 Night Has a Thousand Eyes (1948) - Elderly Italian Woman (uncredited)
 Good Sam (1948) - Mrs. Nelson
 The Strange Mrs. Crane (1948) - Nellie Carter - Juror (uncredited)
 The Snake Pit (1948) - Ward 33 Inmate (uncredited)
 Sundown in Santa Fe (1948) - Ella Mae Watson
 Joan of Arc (1948) - Old Woman (uncredited)
 Family Honeymoon (1948) - Mrs. Webb (uncredited)
 Down to the Sea in Ships (1949) - Mother (uncredited)
 Big Jack (1949) - Mrs. Summers (uncredited)
 The Lovable Cheat (1949) - Virginie
 The Doolins of Oklahoma (1949) - Train Passenger (uncredited)
 Take One False Step (1949) - Gas Station Attendant (uncredited)
 Outcasts of the Trail (1949) - Abbie Rysen
 Scene of the Crime (1949) - Woman at Crime Scene (uncredited)
 Holiday in Havana (1949) - Mama Valdez
 Song of Surrender (1949) - Bidder (uncredited)
 Master Minds (1949) - Mrs. Hoskins
 The Traveling Saleswoman (1950) - Mrs. Owen (uncredited)
 Side Street (1950) - Garsell's Landlady (uncredited)
 Quicksand (1950) - Landlady
 The Arizona Cowboy (1950) - Cactus Kate Millican
 My Blue Heaven (1950) - Mrs. 'Old Mule Face' Bates (uncredited)
 Mister 880 (1950) - Rosie (uncredited)
 The Milkman (1950) - Mrs. Dillon (uncredited)
 The Jackpot (1950) - Woman Trying on Hats (uncredited)
 Harvey (1950) - Nurse Dunphy (uncredited)
 Texans Never Cry (1951) - Mrs. Martha Carter (uncredited)
 Stop That Cab (1951) - Lucy's Mother
 The Great Caruso (1951) - Carmelita Toscano (uncredited)
 Dear Brat (1951) - Woman (uncredited)
 Mask of the Avenger (1951) - Market Woman (uncredited)
 The Raging Tide (1951) - Johnnie Mae Swanson
 Harem Girl (1952) - Aniseh
 Oklahoma Annie (1952) - Mrs. Lottie Fling
 Aaron Slick from Punkin Crick (1952) - Mrs. Peabody
 Anything Can Happen (1952) - Bus Passenger wearing black (uncredited)
 Gobs and Gals (1952) - Mrs. Pursell
 Lost in Alaska (1952) - Mrs. McGillicuddy
 Fearless Fagan (1952) - First Nurse (uncredited)
 Niagara (1953) - Mrs. McGrand, Landlady of McGrand's Boarding House (uncredited)
 She's Back on Broadway (1953) - Rick's Landlady (uncredited)
 Woman They Almost Lynched (1953) - Mrs. Stuart
 By the Light of the Silvery Moon (1953) - Toby Simmons (uncredited)
 Marty (1955) - Mrs. Rosari (uncredited)
 Double Jeopardy (1955) - Mrs. Krezi
 A Man Alone (1955) - Mrs. Maule (uncredited)
 Sudden Danger (1955) - Mrs. Kelly
 Miracle in the Rain (1956) - Mrs. Canelli
 Crashing Las Vegas (1956) - Woman (uncredited)
 The Adventures of Huckleberry Finn (1960) - Miss Sarah Watson (uncredited)
 Mr. Hobbs Takes a Vacation (1962) - Brenda
 7 Faces of Dr. Lao (1964) - Kate Lindquist
 That Funny Feeling (1965) - Woman at Phone Booth

Notes

External links

1894 births
1966 deaths
Burials at Hollywood Forever Cemetery
20th-century American actresses
Actresses from California
American radio actresses
American stage actresses
American film actresses
People from Eureka, California